Dalrymple is a national park in Queensland, Australia, 1108 km northwest of Brisbane.

The park has unique features such as ancient lava flows and the Burdekin River, the largest river in Queensland. This is the land of Gudjal Aboriginal people.

Among the interesting animals can be found here, bridled nailtail wallaby, greater glider and koala.

The elevation of the terrain is 275 meters above sea level.

References

See also

 Protected areas of Queensland

National parks of Queensland
North Queensland
Protected areas established in 1990
1990 establishments in Australia